Ladislas Goldstein (February 6, 1906 – July 15, 1994) was professor of Electrical Engineering at the University of Illinois (1951–72) and visiting professor of Physics at the University of Paris-Orsay (1957–58, 1963–64, 1967–68). He was born in Dombrád, Kingdom of Hungary. 

He received the BS degree from the College of the City of Nagyvárad, the MS degree from the University of Paris (1928), and a DSc in nuclear physics from the University of Paris (1937).

His research concentrated on the field of nuclear physics. He was notable for the application of gas-discharge phenomena in microwave physics, microwave propagation in free electron media, and infrared detection.

In 1956 he was elected to Fellow of the IEEE. He won the 1958 MTT prize.

References
 Proceedings IRE, 49(12) p. 1967, Dec. 1961.

External links
 The Goldstein historical archive at the AIP
 Goldstein's math genealogy
 MTT Prize Winner
 History of Goldstein's lab at Illinois

1906 births
1994 deaths
University of Illinois faculty
University of Paris alumni
Fellow Members of the IEEE
Hungarian Jews
20th-century Hungarian physicists
Hungarian nuclear physicists
20th-century American physicists
American nuclear physicists
Hungarian electrical engineers
Jewish scientists
Hungarian emigrants to the United States
Jewish physicists
Hungarian expatriates in France